= Victor Heinen =

Luxembourgish footballer

Personal information
- Date of birth: 11 June 1931
- Date of death: 21 August 2008 (aged 77)
- Position: Defender

International career
Years	Team	Apps	(Gls)
1957–1959	Luxembourg	12	(0)

Victor Heinen (11 June 1931 – 21 August 2008) was a Luxembourgish footballer. He played in twelve matches for the Luxembourg national football team from 1957 to 1959.
